Isabella of Aragon (ca. 1247 – 28 January 1271), was Queen of France from 1270 to 1271 by marriage to Philip III of France.

Life 
Isabella was the eighth child and youngest daughter of King James I of Aragon and his second wife, Violant of Hungary. Her exact date of birth was not recorded, but she certainly was born in late 1247 or early 1248 since her father, who financially supported the Monastery of Santa María de Sigena, stipulated in his will in January 1248 that if he had another son, he should become a knight Templar and if the child was a daughter, she should enter Santa María de Sigena as a nun. The will was certainly abandoned before Isabella's birth because she was married.

On 11 May 1258, the Treaty of Corbeil was concluded between Isabella's father and King Louis IX of France. As part of the agreement a betrothal was arranged between Louis's second son, Philip, and Isabella, the youngest daughter of James I. The formal wedding took place on 28 May 1262 at the city of Clairmont (currently Clermont-Ferrand); by that time, Philip was already the heir apparent to the French throne due to the death of his older brother, Louis, in 1260. 

Having accompanied her husband and father-in-law on the Eighth Crusade against Tunis in July 1270, Isabella became queen of France the following month on the death of King Louis IX. On their way home, while crossing the Savuto river near Martirano in Calabria, on 11 January 1271 she suffered a fall from her horse: six months pregnant with her fifth child, she gave birth prematurely to a son, who died soon after. First transported to Martirano Castle and then to Cosenza, exhausted and feverish, Isabella died there on 28 January 1271 aged 24. Her death was a devastating emotional blow to her husband, especially since she had been pregnant.

Because she died far from her homeland, the funeral technique of Mos Teutonicus was practiced upon Isabella. Firstly, she was buried at Cosenza Cathedral alongside her newborn son, and then in the royal necropolis in the Basilica of St Denis. Isabella's tomb, like many others, was desecrated during the French Revolution in August 1793. 

The tragic end of Isabella is recalled in the Laudi of the poet Gabriele D'Annunzio.

Issue

Louis (1264 –1276), heir apparent to the French throne from 1270 until his death
Philip IV (1268 –1314), King of France
Robert (1269 –1271).
Charles, Count of Valois (1270 –1325).
Stillborn son (1271).

References

Sources 

|-

1247 births
1271 deaths
Aragonese infantas
Christians of the Eighth Crusade
Deaths by horse-riding accident in Italy
Burials at the Basilica of Saint-Denis
French queens consort
House of Aragon
Philip IV of France
Women in medieval European warfare
Women in war in France
Women in 13th-century warfare
13th-century French women
Daughters of kings